A Swingin' Affair! is the twelfth studio album by Frank Sinatra. It is sometimes mentioned as the sequel to Songs for Swingin' Lovers.

"The Lady Is a Tramp" was bumped from the original album and replaced with "No One Ever Tells You", which had been recorded months earlier. Later, "The Lady is a Tramp" appeared on the soundtrack for Pal Joey. It was restored to the album for the compact disc release.

Track listing
"Night and Day" (Cole Porter)  – 3:58
"I Wish I Were in Love Again" (Richard Rodgers, Lorenz Hart)  – 2:27
"I Got Plenty o' Nuttin'" (DuBose Heyward, George Gershwin, Ira Gershwin)  – 3:09
"I Guess I'll Have to Change My Plan" (Arthur Schwartz, Howard Dietz)  – 2:23
"Nice Work If You Can Get It" (G. Gershwin, I. Gershwin)  – 2:20
"Stars Fell on Alabama" (Frank Perkins, Mitchell Parish)  – 2:37
"No One Ever Tells You" (Hub Atwood, Carroll Coates)  – 3:23
"I Won't Dance" (Jerome Kern, Jimmy McHugh, Oscar Hammerstein II, Otto Harbach, Dorothy Fields)  – 3:21
"The Lonesome Road" (Nat Shilkret, Gene Austin)  – 3:53
"At Long Last Love" (Porter)  – 2:23
"You'd Be So Nice to Come Home To" (Porter)  – 2:03
"I Got It Bad (And That Ain't Good)" (Duke Ellington, Paul Francis Webster)  – 3:21
"From This Moment On" (Porter)  – 3:50
"If I Had You" (Jimmy Campbell, Reginald Connelly, Ted Shapiro)  – 2:35
"Oh! Look at Me Now" (Joe Bushkin, John DeVries)  – 2:48
 CD reissue bonus track not included on the original 1957 release:
"The Lady Is a Tramp" (Rodgers, Hart)  – 3:14

Chart positions

Complete Personnel
 Frank Sinatra – vocals
 Nelson Riddle – arranger, conductor

Tracks 1, 9, 14, 16:

26-November-1956 (Monday) - Hollywood.
Mickey Mangano, Harry Edison, Shorty Sherock, Ray Linn (tpt); Juan Tizol, Murray McEachern, Dick Noel (tbn); George Roberts (b-tbn); Willie Schwartz, Harry Klee (alt); Jules Kinsler, James Williamson (ten); Joe Koch (bar); Victor Bay, Emo Neufeld, Alex Beller, Joe Stepansky, David Frisina, Eudice Shapiro, Harold Dicterow, Alex Murray, Kurt Dieterle, Lou Raderman (vln); Stanley Harris, Maxine Johnson, Alvin Dinkin (via); Eleanor Slatkin, Ennio Bolognini, Edgar Lustgarten (vlc); Kathryn Julye (harp); Bill Miller (p); Nick Bonney (g); Joe Comfort (b); Irving Cottler (d).

Tracks 2, 4, 5, 10:

Mickey Mangano, Conrad Gozzo, Harry Edison, Shorty Sherock (tpt); George Arus, Dick Noel, Ed Kusby (tbn); George Roberts (b-tbn); Willie Schwartz, Harry Klee (alt); Ted Nash, James Briggs (ten); Joe Koch (bar); Felix Slatkin, Paul Shure, Alex Beller, Emo Neufeld, Lou Raderman, Marshall Sosson, Mischa Russell, Nathan Ross, Victor Bay, Gerald Vinci (vln); Maxine Johnson, Alvin Dinkin, David Sterkin (vla); Eleanor Slatkin, Cy Bernard, Edgar Lustgarten (vlc); Kathryn Julye (harp); Bill Miller (p); Nick Bonney (g); Joe Comfort (b); Alvin Stoller (d).

Tracks 3, 6, 8:

Conrad Gozzo, Harry Edison, Mickey Mangano, Mannie Klein (tpt); George Arns, Dick Noel, Ed Kusby (tbn); George Roberts (b-tbn); Jack Dumont, Dominic Mumolo (alt); Don Raffell, Buck Skalak (ten); Paul Lawson (bar); Henry Hill, Alex Beller, Marshall Sosson, Felix Slatkin, Paul Shure, Erno Neufeld, Walter Edelstein, Jacques Gasselin, Nathan Ross, Dan Lube (vln); Maxine Johnson, Alvin Dinkin, David Sterkin (vla); Ennio Bolognini, Eleanor Slatkin, Cy Bernard (vlc); Kathryn Julye (harp); Bill Miller (p); Nick Bonney (g); Joe Comfort (b); Irving Cottler (d).

Track 7:

Ray Linn, Mannie Klein, Shorty Sherock, Harry Edison (tpt); Jimmy Priddy, Milt Bernhart, Ed Kusby (tbn); George Roberts (b-tbn); Willie Schwartz, Harry Klee (alt); Champ Webb, Babe Russin (ten); Chuck Gentry (bar); Felix Slatkin, Paul Shure, Mischa Russell, Harry Bluestone, Henry Hill, Marshall Sosson, Arnold Bdnick, Alex Beller, Victor Bay (vln); Alvin Dinkin, Maxine Johnson (via); Eleanor Slatkin, Cy Bernard, Ennio Bolognini (vlc); Helen Hutchinson (harp); Bill Miller (p); George Van Eps (g); Joe Comfort (b); Alvin Stoller (d); Marilyn Lewis, Alicia Adams, Allan Davies, Ralph Brewster, John Mann, Lee Gotch (voe [1]).

Tracks 11, 12, 13, 15

Pete Candoli, Harry Edison, Shorty Sherock, Ray Linn (tpt); Dick Nash, Tommy Pederson (tbn); Juan Tizol (v-tbn); George Roberts (b-tbn); Skeets Herfurt, Harry Klee (alt); Ted Nash, James Williamson (ten); Joe Koch (bar); Victor Bay, Emo Neufeld, Alex Beller, Victor Amo, David Frisina, Eudice Shapiro, Jacques Gasselin, Felix Slatkin, Paul Shure, Marshall Sosson (vln); David Sterkin, Maxine Johnson, Alvin Dinkin (via); Eleanor Slatkin, Ennio Bolognini, Cy Bernard (vie); Kathryn Julye (harp); Bill Miller (p); Nick Bonney (g); Joe Comfort (b); Alvin Stoller (d).

References

Frank Sinatra albums
Capitol Records albums
1957 albums
Albums produced by Voyle Gilmore
Albums arranged by Nelson Riddle
Albums conducted by Nelson Riddle
Albums recorded at Capitol Studios